is a Japanese sprint canoer who competed in the mid-1980s. At the 1984 Summer Olympics in Los Angeles, he finished eighth in the C-2 500 m event while being eliminated in the semifinals of the C-2 1000 m event.

References
Sports-Reference.com profile

1955 births
Canoeists at the 1984 Summer Olympics
Japanese male canoeists
Living people
Olympic canoeists of Japan
Asian Games medalists in canoeing
Canoeists at the 1990 Asian Games
Medalists at the 1990 Asian Games
Asian Games bronze medalists for Japan
20th-century Japanese people